The 1987 Asia Golf Circuit was the 26th season of golf tournaments that comprised the Asia Golf Circuit.

Despite not winning a tournament, American Jim Hallet claimed the overall circuit title thanks to consistent high finishes throughout the season.

Tournament schedule
The table below shows the 1987 Asia Golf Circuit schedule. After three years absence the Philippine Open returned to the circuit as an official Order of Merit event.

Final standings
The Asia Golf Circuit operated a points based system to determine the overall circuit champion, with points being awarded in each tournament to the leading players. At the end of the season, the player with the most points was declared the circuit champion, and there was a prize pool to be shared between the top players in the points table.

References

Asia Golf Circuit
Asia Golf Circuit